The Hilton London Metropole is a 1,100-room 4-star hotel and conference centre located on Edgware Road in central London. It is bounded by the Marylebone Flyover to the north, Praed Street to the south, and the Paddington Basin development to the west.

History
The London Metropole Hotel opened in 1972. Designed by noted modernist architect Richard Seifert, it consisted of a 24-storey  tower, one of the tallest buildings in the City of Westminster. A second wing, of 11 storeys, was added in 1989.

The Metropole Hotels chain was sold by Lonrho to Stakis Hotels in 1996 and the property was renamed Stakis London Metropole. Ladbroke bought Stakis Hotels in 1999 and rebranded the 48 Stakis Hotels within their Hilton Hotels brand, with the property renamed Hilton London Metropole. A 16-storey  third wing was added to the hotel in 2000, including a conference centre, making it the biggest conference hotel in London, with 39 meeting rooms.

In April 2014 the hotel was the venue for the 44th World Irish Dancing Championship, the first held in England. Hilton sold the hotel, along with the Hilton Birmingham Metropole, to the Tonstate Group in 2006 for £417m. Tonstate sold the two properties to Henderson Park for £500 million in 2017.

See also

Hotels in London
Hilton London Paddington, nearby sister hotel
Paddington Waterside, strategy for the redevelopment of the area between the Metropole and the railway

References

London Metropole
Hotel buildings completed in 1972
Hotels established in 1972
Hotels in London